Prušánky is a municipality and village in Hodonín District in the South Moravian Region of the Czech Republic. It has about 2,200 inhabitants.

History
The first written mention of Prušánky is from 1261.

References

Villages in Hodonín District
Moravian Slovakia